Cionophora is a monotypic genus of flies belonging to the family Therevidae. The only species is Cionophora kollari.

The species is found in Central Europe.

References

Therevidae
Monotypic Diptera genera